Baranova is a rural locality (a village) in Oshibskoye Rural Settlement, Kudymkarsky District, Perm Krai, Russia. The population was 95 as of 2010.

Geography 
It is located 43 km north from Kudymkar.

References 

Rural localities in Kudymkarsky District